The Rondônia warbling antbird (Hypocnemis ochrogyna) is a species of bird in the family Thamnophilidae. Until recently, it was considered a subspecies of the Guianan warbling antbird (Hypocnemis cantator), but based on vocal differences and to a lesser degree differences in plumages they are now treated as separate species. As presently defined, the Rondonia warbling antbird is monotypic.

It is found at lower levels in humid forest and woodland in the Brazilian states of Mato Grosso and Rondônia, and adjacent north-eastern Bolivia.

References

 Zimmer & Isler. 2003. Hypocnemis cantator (Warbling Antbird). Pp. 645 in del Hoyo, Elliott, & Christie. 2003. Handbook of the Birds of the World. Vol. 8. Broadbills to Tapaculos. Lynx Edicions. Barcelona.

Rondônia warbling antbird
Birds of the Brazilian Amazon
Birds of the Bolivian Amazon
Rondônia warbling antbird
Rondônia warbling antbird